Jari Pälve (born 12 May 1965) is a Finnish sports shooter. He competed in three events at the 1992 Summer Olympics.

References

1965 births
Living people
Finnish male sport shooters
Olympic shooters of Finland
Shooters at the 1992 Summer Olympics
Sportspeople from Oulu